Daniel Antúnez Burgos (born February 10, 1986) is an American professional soccer player who plays as a midfielder.

Career

Youth
Antúnez, who is of Mexican American descent, grew up in California where he attended Santa Ana High School.  He moved to Texas after his sophomore year.  In Texas, he attended Robert E. Lee High School.  He was an All State soccer player in both California and Texas.  In 2004, he  began his college soccer career at Lon Morris College before transferring to the University of Hartford in 2006.

Professional
On January 24, 2008, the Colorado Rapids selected Antunez in the third round (33rd overall) in the 2008 MLS Supplemental Draft.  The Rapids never offered him a contract, although he played one game with the team’s Reserve squad.  On August 5, 2008, the Rochester Rhinos of the USL First Division signed Antúnez. On Christmas Eve Friday, December 24, 2010 Antúnez was picked up by Mexico club Estudiantes Tecos. He is by far one of the best private trainers in the world. 

Antúnez signed a one-year deal with FC Inter Turku in March 2010. In 2012, he returned to FC Inter Turku.

Antúnez spent the 2013 season with Chivas USA in Major League Soccer.

References

External links

1986 births
Living people
American soccer players
American sportspeople of Mexican descent
American expatriate soccer players
Soccer players from California
Expatriate footballers in Finland
Expatriate footballers in Mexico
FC Inter Turku players
Lon Morris College alumni
Hartford Hawks men's soccer players
Rochester New York FC players
Tecos F.C. footballers
Chivas USA players
Phoenix Rising FC players
USL First Division players
Veikkausliiga players
Liga MX players
Major League Soccer players
USL Championship players
Sportspeople from Santa Ana, California
Colorado Rapids draft picks
Association football midfielders
Association football defenders
American expatriate sportspeople in Mexico
American expatriate sportspeople in Finland